Turgut Karataş (born 1963), better known as Ankaralı Turgut, is one of the oldest and most popular Romani singers from the "Ankaralı" (English: from Ankara) school of Turkish ethnic music. He started his career in early 1990s. With the impact of popular music culture on Turkey, most regional singers of Ankara turned towards a new kind of novelty music, which puts into music the sexuality and black humor involved in daily life.

Works 

Yakalarsam Tık Tık – If I Catch Her, Knock Knock
Ben Karı İsterim Babo – Daddy, I Want a Woman!
Ver Diyom Vermiyo – I Say "Give It to Me", but She Says "No"
Ankara'nın Gülleri – Roses of Ankara (feat. Ankaralı Yasemin)
Turgutça – In Turgut's Language
Dah Diri Dom Annene Diyiverecem – I'll Tell Your Mother, 'Dah Diri Dom'
Para – Money

References

Living people
Romani Muslims
Romani singers
Turkish male singers
Turkish Muslims
Turkish Romani people
Musicians from Ankara
1963 births